The Roman Catholic Diocese of Barinas is a suffragan Latin diocese, in the Ecclesiastical province of Mérida, in western Venezuela's land-locked Barinas state.

Its cathedral episcopal see is the Marian catedral de Nuestra Señora del Pilar, dedicated to Our Lady of the Pillar, located in the eponymous state capital Barinas.

History 
 On 23 July 1965 Pope Paul VI established the Diocese of Barinas on territories split off from the Diocese of Calabozo and from their Metropolitan, Mérida in Venezuela.
 It lost territory on 3 December 2015 to establish (part of) the Roman Catholic Diocese of Guasdualito, in the same province.

Bishops

Episcopal ordinaries
Suffragan Bishops of Barinas
 Rafael Angel González Ramírez (1965.07.23 – 1992.08.01)
 Antonio José López Castillo (1992.08.01 – 2001.12.27) ; previously Titular Bishop of Theuzi (1988.02.26 – 1992.08.01) & Auxiliary Bishop of Maracaibo (Venezuela) (1988.02.26 – 1992.08.01; later Metropolitan Archbishop of Calabozo (Venezuela) (2001.12.27 – 2007.12.22), Metropolitan Archbishop of Barquisimeto (Venezuela) (2007.12.22 – ...)
 Ramón Antonio Linares Sandoval (2002.07.16 – retired 2013.08.30), previously Bishop of Puerto Cabello (Venezuela) (1994.07.05 – 2002.07.16); later Apostolic Administrator of Acarigua–Araure (Venezuela) (2013.12 – 2015.08.10)
 José Luis Azuaje Ayala (2013.08.30 – 2018.05.24), also Vice-President of Episcopal Conference of Venezuela (2012.01.12 – ...); previously titular Bishop of Italica (1999.03.18 – 2006.07.15) & Auxiliary Bishop of Barquisimeto (Venezuela) (1999.03.18 – 2006.07.15), Apostolic Administrator of El Vigía–San Carlos del Zulia (Venezuela) (2005 – 2006.07.15), promoted Bishop of El Vigía–San Carlos del Zulia (2006.07.15 – 2013.08.30); later Archbishop of Maracaibo 2018.05.24 - ...)
Jesús Alfonso Guerrero Contreras, O.F.M. Cap. (2018.12.21 - ...), previously titular Bishop of Leptiminus (1995.12.06 - 2011.04.09) & Vicar Apostolic of Caroní (1995.12.06 - 2011.04.09), Bishop of Machiques (2011.04.09 - 2018.12.21)

Auxiliary bishops
José Vicente Henriquez Andueza, S.D.B. (1981-1985), appointed Auxiliary Bishop of Caracas, Santiago de Venezuela
Alejandro Figueroa Medina (1986-1995), appointed Bishop of Guanare

Other priest of this diocese who became bishop
Polito Rodríguez Méndez, appointed Bishop of San Carlos de Venezuela in 2016

See also
Roman Catholicism in Venezuela

Sources and external links
 GCatholic.org, with incumbent biography links
 Catholic Hierarchy

Roman Catholic dioceses in Venezuela
Roman Catholic Ecclesiastical Province of Mérida in Venezuela
Christian organizations established in 1965
Roman Catholic dioceses and prelatures established in the 20th century
1965 establishments in Venezuela